List of the military equipment used by the Royal Bhutan Army. The RBA is a mobile infantry force lightly armed with weapons largely supplied by India.

Firearms

Infantry support weapons

Vehicles

References 

Military of Bhutan
Bhutan